Aeneator is a genus of sea snails,  marine gastropod molluscs in the family Buccinidae, the true whelks.

Description
Aeneator is a genus of small to medium sized marine snails. Large shells and fossils of Aeneator can sometimes be confused with those of Penion.

Distribution
Most extant species of Aeneator are found around New Zealand, Chile, and Antarctica. Numerous fossil species are also described from New Zealand.

Evolution
Aeneator is closely related to the genus Buccinulum.

Species
Species in the genus Aeneator include:

 † (Ellicea) Aeneator antorbitus (Fleming, 1955)
 Aeneator attenuatus (Powell, 1927)
 Aeneator benthicolus (Dell, 1963)
 Aeneator castillai (H. S. Mclean & Andrade, 1982)
 Aeneator comptus (Finlay, 1924)
 † (Ellicea) Aeneator conformatus (Marwick, 1931)
  † Aeneator delicatulus (Powell, 1929)
 Aeneator elegans (Suter, 1917)
 Aenator fontainei (d'Orbigny, 1841)
 Aeneator galatheae (Powell, 1958)
 † (Ellicea) Aeneator henchmani (Marwick, 1926)
  † Aeneator huttoni (Finlay, 1930)
 Aeneator loisae (Rehder, 1971)
  † Aeneator marshalli marshalli (R. Murdoch, 1924)
 Aeneator marshalli separabilis (Dell, 1956)
 Aeneator martae (Araya, 2013)
  † Aeneator nothopanax (Fleming, 1954)
 † (Ellicea) Aeneator orbitus (Hutton,  1885)
 Aeneator otagoensis (Finlay, 1930)
 Aeneator portentosus (Fraussen & Sellanes, 2008)
 † (Ellicea) Aeneator perobtusus (Fleming, 1943)
 † Aeneator problematicus (Fleming, 1943)
 Aeneator prognaviter (Fraussen & Sellanes, 2008)
 Aeneator recens (Dell, 1951)
  † Aeneator thomsoni (Marwick, 1924)
  † Aeneator valedictus (Watson, 1886)
 † (Ellicea) Aeneator validus (Marwick, 1928)
 † (Ellicea) Aeneator wairoanus (Marwick, 1965)
 † (Ellicea) Aeneator willetti (Fleming, 1955)

Species brought into synonymy
 Aeneator benthicola [sic]: synonym of Aeneator benthicolus Dell, 1963
  † Aeneator huttoni Stilwell & Zinsmeister, 1992: synonym of  † Prosipho stilwelli Beu, 2009 
 Aeneator valedicta [sic] : synonym of Aeneator valedictus (Watson, 1886)

References

External links
 Revised descriptions of New Zealand Cenozoic Mollusca from Beu and Maxwell (1990)
 Checklist of the Recent Mollusca Recorded from the New Zealand Exclusive Economic Zone

Further reading 
 Powell A. W. B., New Zealand Mollusca, William Collins Publishers Ltd, Auckland, New Zealand 1979 

Buccinidae
Extant Miocene first appearances
Gastropod genera
Taxa named by Harold John Finlay